Teo Bielefeld (born September 11, 1965) is an American former rower. He competed in the men's coxed four event at the 1992 Summer Olympics. After the Olympics, he changed his surname to Bielé, becoming a filmmaker, chef and hunter.

References

External links
 

1965 births
Living people
American male rowers
Olympic rowers of the United States
Rowers at the 1992 Summer Olympics
Sportspeople from Berkeley, California